Clarence Newton Crum (July 27, 1889July 7, 1945) was a professional baseball player. In an eight-year career, Crum played in the 1917 and 1918 Major League Baseball seasons for the Boston Braves. Crum was officially listed as standing  and weighing .

Early life
Crum was born on either July 27, 1889 or July 27, 1890 in Cooks Mills, Illinois.

Career
Crum began playing professional baseball in 1914, spending the year with two teams: the Charleston Senators of the Ohio State League and the Portsmouth Cobblers of the same league. Combined, Crum recorded a 19–13 win–loss record over 19 games pitched. Offensively, he batted .271 with 108 hits and seven home runs.

In 1915, Crum was promoted to the B-level, playing for the San Antonio Bronchos and the Shreveport Gassers, both of the Texas League. Over the 1915 season, Crum pitched 105.2 innings, allowing 64 runs off of 107 hits. He had a batting average of .176 with six total bases.

In 1916, Crum again played for two teams: the Terre Haute Highlanders] of Terre Haute, Indiana, and the Muskegon Reds of Muskegon, Michigan. For the two teams, Crum posted a win–loss record of 10–11 over 31 games pitched. Crum's earned run average (ERA), 2.26, was the second best on the Muskegon Reds (Louis LeRoy recorded an ERA of 1.90 over eight games pitched).

Crum made his Major League debut on May 4, 1917, for the Boston Braves. For the year, he pitched one game, allowing a walk and a hit over one inning pitched.

Crum appeared in one game for the Braves in 1918, recording a loss and a 15.43 ERA, the latter being the worst on the team for the 1918 season. Afterwards, on May 6, 1918, Crum was traded, along with Tex Covington, to the Indianapolis Indians for Dana Fillingim. Over the 1918 season, Crum recorded a 2.50 ERA, and, at age 28, was the second-youngest pitcher on the team.

In 1919, Crum continued his stint with the Indians. His 20 wins and 14 losses were second on the team to former Detroit Tiger Pug Cavet. Crum's 1920 season consisted of playing four games for the Indians. After not playing in the 1921 and 1922 seasons, Crum played his final minor-league baseball season with the Tulsa Oilers. Crum played in eight games for the Oilers, recording a team-best winning percentage of 1.000.

After baseball
Crum died on either July 7, 1945, or December 7, 1945, in Tulsa, Oklahoma, and was buried in Memorial Park Cemetery in Tulsa.

References

External links

1889 births
1945 deaths
Major League Baseball pitchers
Boston Braves players
Baseball players from Illinois
Charleston Senators players
Portsmouth Cobblers players
San Antonio Bronchos players
Shreveport Gassers players
Terre Haute Highlanders players
Muskegon Reds players
Indianapolis Indians players
Tulsa Oilers (baseball) players
 People from Coles County, Illinois